Campagnolo is an Italian manufacturer of high-end bicycle components with headquarters in Vicenza, Italy. The components are organised as groupsets (gruppi), and are a near-complete collection of a bicycle's mechanical parts. Campagnolo's flagship components are the Super Record, Record, and Chorus groupsets with all three representing their recent shift to 12-speed drivetrains.  Super Record and Record are the top groupsets, followed by Chorus, Potenza, Centaur and Veloce. Campagnolo also produces aluminum and carbon wheels, as well as other components (like carbon fiber seat posts, and bottle-cages).

History

Founded by Tullio Campagnolo, the company began in 1933 in a Vicenza workshop.  The founder was a racing cyclist in Italy in the 1920s who conceived several ideas while racing, such as the quick release mechanism for bicycle wheels, derailleurs, and the rod gear for gear changing.  Campagnolo has been awarded more than 135 patents for innovations in cycling technology.

At the end of the 1950s, Campagnolo started to manufacture magnesium parts such as wheels for sports cars like Alfa Romeo, Ferrari, Lamborghini, and Maserati, and built chassis for NASA satellites in 1969. In 1963, Campagnolo produced a disc brake for the Innocenti Lambretta TV motorscooter - the first two-wheel production vehicle with such a brake. In the 1970s they also supplied wheels for Ferrari's Formula One cars.

Campagnolo worked with the manufacturer Colnago and racer Eddy Merckx and produced lightweight parts for the bike he used to beat the world hour record in 1972. Merckx used Campagnolo exclusively and was a friend of Tullio Campagnolo.

Following Campagnolo's success during the 1970s and '80s, innovation lagged as rival SunTour developed indexed shifting, Shimano combined shifter/brake levers (Shimano Total Integration), and FSA introduced compact chainsets.  An unsuccessful foray into mountain biking, the overbuilt and heavy Euclid, Centaur and Olympus groupsets contributed to the company's decline during those years.  By the time the expensive Record O.R. (off-road) and Icarus MTB groupsets made it to the market, Campagnolo's reputation was firmly cemented as a road bike brand.  As a result, Campagnolo pulled out of the Mountain Bike market in 1994.  Despite its struggles, Campagnolo introduced its ErgoPower combined shifter/brake levers and renewed its focus on high-end road cycling components.

The late 1990s and early 2000s saw Campagnolo's increased use of carbon fibre and titanium parts in groupsets and the development of wheelsets.  In 2004, Campagnolo introduced a complete Compact drivetrain with smaller chainrings, to give lower gears than traditional drivetrains.  Other innovations included a Hirth-joint engineered Ultra-Torque external-bearing crankset and G3 spoke lacing for racing wheels.  In 2008, Campagnolo introduced 11-speed drivetrains with Super Record, Record, and Chorus groupsets.  Campagnolo has released an electronic version of its drivetrain. In April 2018 Campagnolo launched 12-speed Record and Super Record groupsets, and in 2020, the company launched Campagnolo Ekar, a 13-speed groupset aimed at gravel riders.

Campagnolo has focused on road cycling and track cycling. The teams it sponsors in the UCI ProTour are Lotto–Soudal, AG2R Citroën Team, UAE Team Emirates and Cofidis.

Timeline (Bicycle Parts)
1901
Tullio Campagnolo born on 26 August in the eastern suburbs of Vicenza, Italy

1922
Tullio Campagnolo begins his racing career

1930
Campagnolo patents the quick-release hub

1933
After fabricating parts in the backroom of his father's hardware store, Tullio starts Campagnolo SPA with production of the quick-release hub

1940
Tullio hires his first full-time employee. The derailleur enters production, enabling gears to change without removing the wheel. The pieces are handmade

1949
Campagnolo introduces a parallelogram rear derailleur, the Gran Sport

1956
Campagnolo introduces a parallelogram front derailleur

1963
The Record rear derailleur (chromed bronze) is introduced

1966
The Nuovo Record rear derailleur is introduced. Eddy Merckx uses it for his first four Tour de France victories

1973
The Super Record Road and Track groups are introduced. Learn more about the Super Record Road group.;

1983
Tullio Campagnolo dies on 3 February. Anniversary groupset to mark 50 years of Campagnolo bicycle parts.

1985 Campagnolo creates Delta brakes, with a parallelogram linkage to actuate the calipers.

1986
The re-designed Record road and track groupsets (also known as C-Record) are introduced, replacing Super Record as the top of range

1987
The last year of Super Record until 2008

1989
Campagnolo introduces a mountain bike groupset, which is heavier and less advanced than those by Shimano and SunTour.

1991
8-speed shifting components are introduced

1992
The ErgoPower levers are introduced, which combines brake lever and a shift lever to answer Shimano's STI levers

1993
Delta brakes are discontinued

1994
Campagnolo leaves the mountain bike components business

1995
Group names on components are introduced

1997
9-speed shifting components are introduced

1998
Next generation Ergo Levers

1999
Record Carbon Ergo levers, Daytona group, and for the Record, Chorus and Daytona groups new hubs (much lighter than the old ones, axles made of aluminum alloy) are introduced

2000
10-speed shifting is introduced

2001
Carbon-fiber shifting levers for Record group

2002
Former Daytona group is renamed "Centaur"

2004
Carbon-fiber cranks for Record and Chorus groups

2005
10-speed Centaur and Chorus shift and brake levers are introduced for flat bar road bikes

Fulcrum Wheels, a company owned by Campagnolo, produces wheelsets compatible with Campagnolo and Shimano cassettes.

2006
Hollow external bearing crankset is announced

2007
10-speed Mirage and Xenon component groups and new Ultra-Torque components are introduced. Record hubs are now black, 20 g lighter and don't have greaseports any more

2008
11-speed Record, Super Record, and Chorus groups are introduced

2009
Re-introduction of Athena as an 11-speed component group below Chorus in product line

2010
Bora One wheels are introduced

2011
First electric 11-speed Super Record group was used at the Tour de France by Team Movistar

2012
Bora Ultra 80mm wheels are introduced.

2013
80th anniversary groupset made.

2014
Super Record RS groupset introduced following input from professional team riders.

The ErgoBrain cyclocomputer compatible with the Ergo shifters  displays cadence, gear, and the normal functions of a cyclocomputer.

2015
Athena EPS discontinued and Chorus EPS introduced.

Chorus, Record and Super Record groupsets are overhauled with a 4 arm, 8 bolt chainset introduced.

Bora 50 and 35 wheels become available in Clincher and adopt a wider rim profile.

2015
Potenza group is introduced.

2017
Centaur group reintroduced as Campagnolo's least expensive 11-speed group.

2018
12-speed Super Record and Record mechanical groups are introduced.(for disc and rimbrake)

Bora WTO (Wind Tunnel Optimized) wheels are introduced.

2019
12-speed Super Record EPS, and mechanical 12-speed Chorus groups are introduced. Chorus will have an 11-34 cassette option and a 96/123 mm BCD with sub-compact 48/32 gearing available.

2020
13-speed Ekar group are introduced.

2021
Bora Ultra WTO (only for discbrake) wheels are introduced.

Trademarks
Campagnolo has used various trademarks, the best known is the Campagnolo signature; another is a hub quick-release lever (Tullio's most famous innovation). The logo of the company is the winged wheel.

See also

 List of bicycle parts
 List of Italian companies

References

External links

 Official website
 Catalog website

Campagnolo
Cycle parts manufacturers
Wheel manufacturers
Italian brands
Sporting goods manufacturers of Italy
Automotive companies established in 1933
Italian companies established in 1933
Companies based in Vicenza